Juan Pablo Varillas was the defending champion but chose not to participate.

Francisco Cerúndolo won the title after defeating Roberto Carballés Baena 6–4, 3–6, 6–3 in the final.

Seeds

Draw

Finals

Top half

Bottom half

References

External links
Main draw
Qualifying draw

Campeonato Internacional de Tênis de Campinas - Singles
2020 Singles